Aliwal village comes under the Jalandhar East development block of Jalandhar. Jalandhar is a district in the Indian state of Punjab.

About 
Aliwal lies on the Shahkot-Lohian road. Via phull-turna. The nearest railway station to Aliwal is Mulewal Khaira Railway station at 4 km from it.

Post Code
Aliwal's PIN is 144701.

References 

Villages in Jalandhar district